Abasár is a village (population 2,593) in Heves county in Hungary, situated near Gyöngyös in the foothills of the Mátra mountains. It was founded as Saár (literally "mud", later Sár) in 1261, and later took the prefix Aba from the Aba clan. To the west of the village is the Sár-hegy (Sár Hill), a national nature reserve.

The area was inhabited intermittently according to archaeological evidence as early as around 2500 BC and was first mentioned in writings from 1261. In 1950 the village merged with Pálosvörösmart and in 2006 split back into two separate villages.

In the 19th and 20th centuries, few Jews lived in the village. Most of them were murdered in the Holocaust.

References

External links

 Official site in Hungarian

Populated places in Heves County
Jewish communities destroyed in the Holocaust